Antho- is a prefix derived from the Ancient Greek ἄνθος (anthos) meaning “flower”.

It is found in words such as :
 Anthomania, an obsession with flowers
 Anthocyanins, a class of phenolic pigments found in plants
 Anthodite, a type of cave formations composed of long needle-like crystals situated in clusters which radiate outward from a common base
 Anthology
 Anthotype, a photographic process using plant and flower material
 Anthozoa, a class within the phylum Cnidaria that contains the sea anemones and corals
 Anthomedusae (a.k.a. Anthoathecatae), an order of marine invertebrates
 Anthocerotophyta, the hornworts, a division of non-vascular plants 
 Anthocoridae, the minute pirate bugs or flower bugs, a family of bugs
 Anthochori, Arcadia, a former settlement in Greece
 Anthophyta, the anthophytes, ancestors of modern flowering plants

See also 
 Anthos (disambiguation)
 Anthus (mythology)

Prefixes